Copper columns of Ma Yuan were a pair of copper columns erected by General Ma Yuan of Han China after his suppression of the Trung sisters' rebellion in 43 AD. The columns stood at southern frontier of Tượng Lâm (Xianglin) to mark the boundary of Chinese territory against the barbarians. Ma prayed to the heaven: "if the columns break, Jiaozhi will be destroyed." (銅柱折交趾滅) The location of the column is unknown, with various explanations given for its disappearance. One popular story is that locals developed a superstitious habit of placing rocks to support the column as they passed and that, over time, this pile grew so large that it completely covered the columns. Another is that they threw the rocks from hatred. Later rationalist Chinese and Vietnamese scholars opined that it had probably simply fallen into the sea in the course of an earthquake or change of shoreline. 

In 1272, Kublai sent his emissary to Vietnam to search for the columns. Trần Thánh Tông replied they had disappeared for a long time and were hard to find. The emissary had to give up.

References

Monumental columns
Military history of the Han dynasty
Military history of Vietnam